Jean-François Larose (born April 15, 1972) is a Canadian former politician who was elected to the House of Commons of Canada in the 2011 election. He represented the electoral district of Repentigny, initially as a member of the NDP, then as a member of Strength in Democracy.

Prior to being elected, Larose was a peace officer and a security guard. Larose has certificates from Université de Montréal in the areas of crisis management, violence and society, and police and security management. Larose ran in the 2009 Montreal municipal election, seeking the position of mayor of Le Plateau-Mont-Royal borough for the Parti Montréal Ville-Marie; he garnered 2.08% of the vote.

In the 2011–12 NDP leadership race, Larose supported Niki Ashton, serving as her campaign chair.

Larose campaigned as a member of the NDP in the 2011 election, handily winning the riding of Repentigny. On October 21, 2014, Larose and Jean-François Fortin, the independent (formerly Bloc Québécois) MP for Haute-Gaspésie—La Mitis—Matane—Matapédia, announced that they were forming Strength in Democracy, a new Quebec-focused political party dedicated to representing the province's regions.

In the 2015 election, Larose contested in La Pointe-de-l'Île and lost to Mario Beaulieu. He came in seventh, receiving 135 votes and winning only 0.24% of the vote.

Electoral record

References

External links

1972 births
Living people
Members of the House of Commons of Canada from Quebec
New Democratic Party MPs
People from Repentigny, Quebec
Université de Montréal alumni
Strength in Democracy MPs
21st-century Canadian politicians